Lalkar (Challenge) is a 1972 Indian Hindi-language war action film produced and directed by Ramanand Sagar. It was adapted from a Hindi novel Sagar had written, called "Lalkar". The film had music composed by Kalyanji Anandji and the lyricists were Hasrat Jaipuri, Indeevar, Mahendra Dehlvi and Kulwant Jani. It was rated as a hit and cited as one of the "highest grossers" of 1972. Stated to be the costliest war film produced at the time, it starred Dharmendra, Rajendra Kumar, Mala Sinha and Kumkum in lead roles. The rest of the cast included Nazir Hussain, Sujit Kumar, Ramesh Deo, Dara Singh and Agha.

Plot
Two sons of Colonel Kapoor, one in the Army and One in the Air force are in love with the same girl. But before anything could be finalized, both are sent to a mission against the Japanese to destroy their secret airport. Will they be able to finish their mission? Will they come back alive? Who will win the girl?

Cast

Dharmendra as Major Ram Kapoor
Rajendra Kumar as Wing Commander Rajan Kapoor
Mala Sinha as Usha Choudhury
Kumkum as Rajkumari Toshi
Dev Kumar as Captain Dev
Nana Palsikar as Colonel Kapoor
Nazir Hussain as Colonel Choudhury
Tun Tun as Danko
Keshto Mukherjee as Keshto
Sujit Kumar
Agha
Roopesh Kumar
Manmohan as Japanese Army Officer
Ramesh Deo
Dara Singh
Ajit singh deol

Soundtrack

References

External links

1972 films
1970s Hindi-language films
1970s action war films
Indian aviation films
Films scored by Kalyanji Anandji
Indian action war films
Films directed by Ramanand Sagar
Indian Army in films
Films set in Myanmar
Indian Air Force in films
Indian World War II films